Magnus Norman was the defending champion but lost in the semifinals to Bohdan Ulihrach.

Andrea Gaudenzi won in the final 7–5, 6–3 against Ulihrach.

Seeds
A champion seed is indicated in bold text while text in italics indicates the round in which that seed was eliminated.

  Magnus Norman (semifinals)
  Dominik Hrbatý (first round)
  Albert Portas (quarterfinals)
  Andreas Vinciguerra (second round)
  Bohdan Ulihrach (final)
  Michal Tabara (quarterfinals)
  Magnus Gustafsson (first round)
  Fernando Vicente (first round)

Draw

External links
 Main draw
 Qualifying draw

Men's Singles
2001 ATP Tour